Acton is an English surname. Notable people with the surname include:

 John Dalberg-Acton, 1st Baron Acton (1834–1902): Lord Acton, the Catholic historian
 Richard Lyon-Dalberg-Acton, 4th Baron Acton (1941–2010), his great-grandson, Labour peer and life peer
 John Lyon-Dalberg-Acton, 5th Baron Acton (born 1966), his great-great grandson, writer and farmer
 Sir John Acton, 6th Baronet (1736–1811), his grandfather, admiral and Prime Minister of the Kingdom of Naples
 Charles Januarius Edward Acton (1803–1847), his uncle, Cardinal of Santa Maria della Pace
 Guglielmo Acton (1825–1896), his first cousin once removed, officer in the Neapolitan Navy, attempted to intercept Garibaldi at Marsala
 Harold Acton (1904–1994), his distant cousin, writer, dandy and dilettante
 Abraham Acton (1893–1915), British Army soldier
 Alejandro Acton (born 1972), Argentine cyclist
 Alfredo Acton (1867–1934), Italian admiral, politician and Chief of Staff of the Italian Navy
 Anna Acton (born 1979), British actress
 Ben Acton (1927–2020), Australian ice hockey player
 Brian Acton (born 1972), American computer programmer and Internet entrepreneur
 Brian Acton (born 1985), American transportation designer and product designer
 Brigitte Acton (born 1985), Canadian alpine skier
 Bud Acton (born 1942), American basketball player
 Carlo Acton (1829–1909), Italian composer and pianist
 Charles Acton (disambiguation)
 Cheryl Acton, Utah state legislator
 Dawn Acton (born 1977), English actress and deejay
 Edward Acton (disambiguation)
 Eliza Acton (1799–1859), English poet and cook
 Ferdinando Acton (1832–1891), Italian naval admiral and politician
 Forman S. Acton (1920–2014), American computer scientist and writer
 H. B. Acton (1908–1974), British writer and philosopher
 Henry Acton (1797–1843), English Unitarian minister
 James Acton (1848–1924), English cricketer
 James M. Acton, British academic and scientist
 Joe Acton (1852–1917), English wrestler
 John Acton (disambiguation)
 Keith Acton (born 1958), Canadian former National Hockey League player
 Loren Acton (born 1936), American physicist and astronaut
 Marv Acton (born 1944), American NASCAR driver
 Matt Acton (born 1992), Australian association football player
 Prue Acton (born 1943), Australian fashion designer
 R. G. Acton (1864/1865–1900), American football coach
 Ralph Acton (fl. 14th century), English theologian and philosopher
 Sir Richard Acton, 5th Baronet (1712–1791), English baronet
 Robert Acton (1497–1558), English politician
 Samuel Acton (c. 1773 – 1837), English architect
 Scott T. Acton, American professor
 Shane Acton, English sailor known for circumnavigating the globe
 Thomas Acton (Jesuit), English Jesuit and missionary 
 Thomas C. Acton, American public servant, politician, and police commissioner of the New York City Police Department
 Thomas Acton (British Army officer)
 Sir Walter Acton, 2nd Baronet (c. 1621 – 1665), English landowner and politician
 Whitmore Acton (c. 1677 – 1731/32), British baronet and politician
 William Acton (disambiguation), several people with this name, including:
 William Acton (doctor) (1813–1875), British doctor and writer

See also 
 Marion Adams-Acton (1846–1928), Scottish novelist
 Murray Adams-Acton (1886–1971), English art and architecture historian, and interior designer
 Dalberg-Acton
 Baron Acton

References 

English-language surnames
English toponymic surnames